Jill Mulleady is an artist. She was born in Montevideo, Uruguay and grew up in Buenos Aires, Argentina. She moved to London to study at Chelsea School of Art, in 2007–09, where she received a Master of Fine Arts. She lives and work in Los Angeles, California.

Her work has been shown at the Whitney Museum of American Art, Hammer Museum, Huntington Library, Le Consortium, 58th Venice Biennale central exhibition,  Kunsthalle Bern, Swiss Institute Contemporary Art New York ,  National Archaeological Museum, Naples, Hirshhorn Museum and Sculpture Garden, Washington, DC, Luis Barragán House and Studio, Mexico City, Schinkel Pavillon, Berlin and Eduardo Sívori Museum, Buenos Aires.

Mulleady’s works are held in the collections of the Hammer Museum, Los Angeles; Musée d'Art Moderne de Paris, Whitney Museum of American Art, Hirshhorn Museum and Sculpture Garden, Washington DC; Los Angeles County Museum of Art, Los Angeles;  Le Consortium, Fondazione S. de Rebaudengo, Turin; among others.

References 

Living people
Uruguayan painters
Uruguayan women painters
21st-century Uruguayan women artists
Uruguayan expatriates in the United States
Year of birth missing (living people)